City Center, Florida may refer to:
City Center, Miami Beach, Florida, a neighborhood in Miami Beach.
An incorrect term for Sun City Center, Florida.